Lichter is a German surname meaning somebody who castrates animals 
The Jewish surname Lichter means "lights".

Notable people
 Horst Lichter (born 1962), German chef, television moderator and writer
 Ivan Lichter (1912–2009), New Zealand surgeon
 Marika Lichter (born 1949), Austrian actress
 Samuel Robert Lichter, American political scientist

Film
 Distant Lights (2003 film) (Lichter), a 2003 German film

References

German-language surnames